Deron Michael McBee (born August 23, 1960) is an American actor and sportsman, known for playing Motaro in Mortal Kombat: Annihilation and as Malibu on American Gladiators.

Career 
Deron McBee toured the professional racquetball circuit for three years.

McBee was an original Gladiator on American Gladiators, performing under the name Malibu. McBee appeared for one season on the show and returning several years later for the live tour. McBee is known for (as Malibu) his blond hair, tanned skin, and surfer persona.

McBee has trained in karate at the Billy Blanks World Karate Studio, and hand-to-hand combat and swordsmanship with Anthony De Longis.

As an actor McBee has generally been cast in action movies, usually in roles which allow him to use his fighting skills to portray a villain. For example, in Enter the Blood Ring, he portrays the wrestler Gregor.

His most notable film role is that of Motaro in the second Mortal Kombat film, Mortal Kombat: Annihilation. In the DVD extras of The Killing Zone, McBee states that he has produced his impressive physique by abstaining from steroids and using a combination of prayer and faith.

In addition to film, McBee has had many guest starring roles on television.

McBee was a deputy sheriff with the Los Angeles County Sheriff's Department in the early 1980s.

Personal life
Deron was married to Drzan McBee, a former professional wrestler and Raiderette, who died in 2003 from a heart attack. She was survived by her two daughters.

Deron is now mostly involved in Christian ministry and in pursuing his painting passion. In June 2016 his interview with First Comics News was released.

Filmography

References

External links 
 
American Gladiators Malibu Profile (GladiatorsTV.com)
Deron McBee Full Version
Personal Website

American male film actors
1961 births
Living people
American male television actors
American Christians